Andinacaste is an extinct genus of trilobites. It contains two species, A. espejensis, and A. legrandi. Fossils have been found in the Catavi Formation of Bolivia.

References 

Calmoniidae
Phacopida genera
Devonian trilobites of South America
Devonian Bolivia
Fossils of Bolivia
Fossil taxa described in 1979